The following lists events that happened during 1941 in Chile.

Incumbents
President of Chile: Pedro Aguirre Cerda (until 25 November), Jerónimo Méndez

Events

February
2 February – The 1941 South American Championship held in Chile begins.

March
2 March – Chilean parliamentary election, 1941
4 March - ends the 1941 South American Championship held in Chile.

April
6 April - Municipal elections are held throughout the country, the Popular Front obtains 35.46% of the total votes, followed by the Liberal Party with 19.18%, the Conservative Party with 16.41%, and the Socialist Party with 14.46%.

Births 
20 February – Juan Olivares
16 July – Gladys Marín (d. 2005)
26 September – Rodrigo González Torres
31 December – Hugo Berly (d. 2009)

Deaths
date unknown – Emilio Bello
25 November – Pedro Aguirre Cerda

References 

 
Years of the 20th century in Chile
Chile